Honour to Senator Murray Sinclair is a Canadian short documentary film, directed by Alanis Obomsawin and released in 2021. The film intercuts excerpts of former Canadian senator Murray Sinclair's 2016 acceptance speech, when he was presented with an award by the World Federalist Movement-Canada in honour of his role as chair of the Truth and Reconciliation Commission of Canada, with the personal testimonies of various survivors of the Canadian Indian residential school system.

The film premiered at the 2021 Toronto International Film Festival, as part of its special Celebrating Alanis retrospective of Obomsawin's films.

The film was named to TIFF's annual year-end Canada's Top Ten list for 2021.

References

2021 films
2021 short documentary films
Canadian short documentary films
Films directed by Alanis Obomsawin
National Film Board of Canada documentaries
Works about residential schools in Canada
2020s English-language films
2020s Canadian films